Steve Freeman is an English retired association football midfielder who played professionally in the USISL A-League.

Youth
A native of England, Freeman came to the United States to attend Florida Institute of Technology. He also played for the FIT soccer team from 1986 to 1989. In 1988, FIT won the NCAA Division II Men's Soccer Championship and Freeman was selected as a First Team All American. He repeated as First Team All American in 1989. In 1995, he was inducted into the FIT Hall of Fame.

Professional
In 1992, Freeman turned professional with the Orlando Lions of the USISL. In 1994, Freeman left the Lions to sign with the Cocoa Expos, but in June, he left the Expos to return to the Lions. In 1995 and 1996, Freeman began and ended each season with the Expos as they played in the USISL Premier League. In 1997, he played for the Orlando Sundogs in their single year of existence in the USISL A-League. In 1998, he moved to the Orlando Nighthawks in the USISL D-3 Pro League. In 2000, Freeman returned to the Cocoa Expos. In 2003, he began the season with the Central Florida Kraze, but played three games for the Expos as well. He works for Morgan Stanley in Orlando, Florida.

References

Living people
Orlando City U-23 players
Cocoa Expos players
English footballers
English expatriate footballers
Florida Tech Panthers men's soccer players
Orlando Lions (1992–1996) players
Orlando Sundogs players
USL League Two players
USISL players
USL Second Division players
A-League (1995–2004) players
Association football midfielders
English expatriate sportspeople in the United States
Expatriate soccer players in the United States
Year of birth missing (living people)